Thore-Andreas Jacobsen (born 19 April 1997) is a German professional footballer who plays as a defensive midfielder for  club SV Elversberg.

Career
Jacobsen was born in Henstedt-Ulzburg, Germany. He began his youth career at TSV Nahe before moving to Hamburger SV in 2009. In 2015, he moved to rivals Werder Bremen, where he joined the second and U-19 teams, where he is most often used as a midfielder. He made his 3. Liga debut off the bench on 5 September 2015 in a 3–1 loss to Preußen Münster.

In March 2018, Jacobsen agreed a contract extension with Werder Bremen, making it his first contract on professional terms.

Jacobsen moved to 3. Liga side 1. FC Magdeburg on loan for the 2019–20 season in June 2019. Having returned to Werder Bremen in summer 2020, he was linked with a move to a 2. Bundesliga club. In September, however, he re-joined 1. FC Magdeburg on loan for the season.

On 30 June 2022, Jacobsen joined recently promoted 3. Liga club SV Elversberg on a two-year contract.

References

External links
 

1997 births
Living people
German footballers
Association football midfielders
SV Werder Bremen II players
1. FC Magdeburg players
SV Elversberg players
3. Liga players
People from Henstedt-Ulzburg
Footballers from Schleswig-Holstein
20th century in sports
German athletes